This is a list of notable high schools in Indonesia. This list is not intended to be complete, as there would be too many high schools.

Schools in Indonesia 

In Indonesia, primary schools or SD ( - "Elementary School") are from 1st to 6th grade, while high schools (secondary school) generally comprises junior secondary school (7th-9th grade) or SMP ( - "First Middle-grade School"), senior secondary school (10-12th grade) or SMA ( - "Upper Middle-grade School") or SMU ( - "General Middle-grade School") and SMK  ( - "Middle-grade Vocational School '), with virtually all public school operated this way. Private school may combine them, even though the students still wear different uniforms. 

Public school (SMPN, SMAN/SMUN and SMKN, with 'N' being Negeri or "State") employs standardized uniform outfit: red skirts and short trousers for primary schoolers, navy blue skirts and short trousers for junior secondary schoolers, and grey long skirts and long trousers for senior secondary schoolers and vocational school and some vocational schoolers adding different uniform outfit . Every students wear white shirt on top. Private school may choose different outfit for their students, but generally all shools employ uniforms, sometimes several sets of them, including Pramuka (boyscout) uniform, batik uniform, etc. Public schools often, but not always, employs number in their names, corresponding to the order of their formation, e.g. SD/SMP/SMA Negeri 1/2/3 etc. followed by city/regency names, and usually don't carry personal names.

Before 2015, mandatory school in Indonesia is 9 years, from 1st to 9th grade, therefore the senior secondary school was not mandatory. Since 2015, however, the mandatory school are extended throughout 12 grades. Tertiary schools (or  - "High School") are college and university level.

Schools in Indonesia are under the care of Ministry of Education and Culture, and for some period (2014-2019), the universities ("high" school or sekolah tinggi) are moved under the Ministry of Research and Technology. The religious schools are under the responsibility of Ministry of Religion.

Religiously organized schools include Muslim, Christian, and Catholic private schools. Muslim schools uses Arabic terms in their names, like: Madrasah Ibtidaiyah (MI) = SD, Madrasah Tsanawiyah (MTs) = SMP, and Madrasah Aliyah (MA) = SMA. Christian schools uses abbreviation SDK, SMPK, SMAK/SMUK, or spelled them out SD Kristen, SMP Kristen, or SMA Kristen in their names. Catholic schools uses Saints (Santo) and Saintesses' (Santa) names in their school names, or uses Kolese (college) in their names. Secular schools didn't use any of the above, and choose secular names. Vocational schools (mainly for senior secondary school) are called SMK ( - "Vocational Middle-grade School"). Foreign-operated schools may uses English, romanized Arabic, or Chinese (pinyin) names.

Statistics of senior secondary schools 
General schools
According to school year 2017-18 senior secondary school (SMA) statistics from Ministry of Education, in 2017 Indonesia has 13.495 SMA (almost 50%-50% ratio between public and private schools)  with more than 160 thousand total classrooms (around 12 classrooms per school) and 30 thousands laboratories and 11 thousands libraries, 1,6 million new/10th grade SMA students (45%-55% male-female ratio), 4.8 million total SMA students (averaging 356 students per school, almost evenly distributed between 10th, 11th, and slightly lower number of 12th graders), 1.4 million graduates (98.8% completion rates, 0.67% dropouts, 0.2% repeats), more than 300 thousands SMA headperson and teachers (averaging 22 teachers per school), and almost 60 thousand other non-teaching staff. 

The most schools are in West Java and East Java (the most heavily populated provinces), around 1.5 thousands each (with 671 and 535 thousand students respectively), while the youngest province of Indonesia, North Kalimantan, have the least schools, 59, with 16 thousand students.

With regard to the school time, almost all schools (92,1%) are morning schools, while 4,4% are evening schools, and the rest are a combination. With regard to religion, 79% of the students are Moslem, 12% Protestants, 5% Catholics, 2% Hindu, 1% Buddhist, with a very small minority (0.05%) of Confucianist religion, and other beliefs. With regard to preference for public/private schools, the Moslem and Hindu students  overwhelmingly favor public schools, the Christian and Catholics somewhat prefer public schools, and the Buddhist and Confucianists overwhelmingly favor private schools.

Teachers
In 2017, Indonesia has more than 300 thousands SMA teachers and headmasters/mistresses (41%-59% male-female ratio), which unlike the half-and-half split between the number of school, is highly skewed toward public school (72% teachers), among them 156 thousand full-time teachers (more than 50%) have the coveted status of National Civil Servant (Pegawai Negeri Sipil - PNS), further split between 147 thousands (94% of PNS) teaching in public school and 8 thousands (6% of PNS) in private schools, while the rest of the teachers are privately employed (19%), or part-time teachers (31%). The majority of the teachers (98%) have bachelor's degree or higher, quite young (56% are 40 years old or younger, and only 7% are 56 years old or older), and relatively new (56% have only worked for less than 10 years, while 14% have worked for more than 25 years). Their number have decreased around 20% from two years ago (362 thousands). The average number of teachers per school is 23.

Students
In 2017, Indonesia has 4.8 million total SMA students, averaging 356 students per school in general, 519 students per public school, and 190 students per private school, with an average of 30 students per classes, and 16 students per teachers. The number of repeat-graders are 0.2% in average, and the number of dropouts are 0.67%, distributed around 25% 10th graders, 25% 11th graders, and 50% 12th graders with total of more than 31 thousand students (55%-45% male-female ratio), which are lower than previous two years (36 and 40 thousands respectively). The completion rate of SMA students in average is 98.8%.

From provincial statistics, the province with the most students per school is Bali (545), while the least is North Maluku (198), and the most teachers per school are West Sumatra (36) and Bali (34), and the least is North Maluku (15). But for private school, West Java has the most number of students per school (891), while private school in Central Kalimantan only has 95 students per school.

List of private senior secondary schools 
Below are some of the 6.763 private schools in Indonesia: (Some of the English names of these schools are not necessarily official names, but merely translation. But most with official English names have influences based on international curriculums, international affiliations or religious affiliations)

 ACG School Jakarta
 AIS Indonesia
 Al-Izhar Pondok Labu
 ACS Jakarta
 Bandung Alliance International School
 Bandung International School
 Bina Bangsa School
 Blossom International School
 British School Jakarta
 Cendana Educational Foundation Schools, Riau
 Chandra Kusuma School, Medan
 Charis Global School, Lippo Cikarang, Bekasi, West Java
 Cita Hati Christian School, Surabaya
 Diakonia Catholic School, Jakarta
 Don Bosco Pondok Indah, Jakarta
 Gandhi Memorial International School
 Jakarta Intercultural School, Jakarta
 Jakarta Japanese School, South Tangerang (ジャカルタ日本人学校)
 Jakarta Taipei School, Jakarta (雅加达台湾学校)
 Jakarta Theological Seminary, Jakarta
 Kolese Gonzaga, Jakarta
 Kolese Kanisius, Jakarta
 Kolese Loyola, Semarang, Central Java
 Lycée Français Louis-Charles Damais
 Manado International School, North Sulawesi
 Medan International School
 Mountainview International Christian School, Salatiga, Central Java
 New Zealand Independent School Jakarta
 North Jakarta International School, Jakarta
 Nurul Fikri Boarding School
 Pelangi Kasih School
 PSKD Mandiri
 Raffles International Christian School
 Regina Pacis School, Palmerah, Jakarta Barat
 Saint Joseph's School, Malang
 Sekolah Bogor Raya
 Sekolah Dian Harapan, Tangerang, Jakarta
 Sekolah Dyatmika, Bali
 Sekolah Global Indo-Asia, Batam
 Sekolah High/Scope Indonesia
 Sekolah Menengah Atas Kristen Penabur Gading Serpong
 Sekolah Pelita Harapan, Jakarta
 Sinarmas World Academy, BSD City, Tangerang
 Singapore International School
 Singapore School Kelapa Gading
 SMU St. Aloysius Bandung
 SMU St. Angela
 SMUK 1 Bandung
 Surabaya European School
 Surabaya Intercultural School, Surabaya, East Java
 Sutomo School, Medan (苏东中学)
 St. Ursula School Bumi Serpong Damai
 Tarakanita
 Taruna Nusantara, Magelang, Central Java
 Telkom Sandhy Putra Vocational School, Medan, North Sumatera
 Trinitas Senior High School, Bandung, West Java
 Wenhua Qiaoliang Trilingual National School (文化桥梁三语国民学校)
 Wesley International School, Malang

List of public senior secondary schools 
Below are some of the 6.732 public senior secondary schools (SMA Negeri) in Indonesia:

 SMA Negeri 3 Bandung
 SMA Negeri 5 Bandung
 SMA Negeri 6 Bandung
 SMA Negeri 19 Bandung
 SMA Negeri 1 Blitar
 SMA Negeri 8 Jakarta
 SMA Negeri 66 Jakarta
 SMA Negeri 68 Jakarta
 SMA Negeri 1 Malang
 SMA Negeri 2 Medan
 SMA Negeri 1 Narmada
 SMA Negeri 3 Padang
 SMA Negeri 1 Wringinanom
 SMA Negeri 1 Yogyakarta

List of public senior vocational schools 
Below are some of the  3,697 public senior vocational school (SMK Negeri) in Indonesia:

 SMK Negeri 10 Bandung
 SMK Negeri 1 Banjar Agung

See also
Education in Indonesia
List of universities in Indonesia
List of Indonesian agricultural universities and colleges

References

 
Schools